The Russell Brand Show is a chat show presented by Russell Brand. It aired on the British terrestrial TV channel Channel 4 and was broadcast on Friday nights. The programme featured Brand's take on current topics of conversation, a sketch on current topics, guest interviews and live music.

Episode guide

Awards
At the 2006 Broadcasting Press Guild Awards, Brand won the award for best TV performer in a non-acting role.

References

External links

2006 British television series debuts
2006 British television series endings
2000s British comedy television series
British television talk shows
Channel 4 comedy
English-language television shows
Russell Brand